Harold "Hal" L. Sirkin (born 1959, died 2022) is an American business consultant and author, who often writes about trends in innovation and global business competition. He graduated summa cum laude from the Wharton School of the University of Pennsylvania in 1980 with a B.S. in Economics, and from the University of Chicago in 1981 with an M.B.A.  He is also a professor at Kellogg School of Management and a CPA.

Career
He is the co-author of two books: Payback: Reaping the Rewards of Innovation, which advises companies to adopt a systematic approach to innovation, and Globality: Competing with Everyone from Everywhere for Everything, which explores strategies for economic competition under globality, the end state of globalization. Payback was named one of the "Best Innovation and Design Books for 2006" by BusinessWeek magazine. Globality was picked by The Economist as one of the best business books of 2008. Sirkin has also contributed to Time and the Harvard Business Review.

Selected bibliography

Books

 Sirkin, Harold L.; Hemerling, James W.; Bhattacharya, Arindam K; with John Butman (2008). Globality: Competing with Everyone from Everywhere for Everything. New York: Business Plus: 
 Sirkin, Harold L.; Andrew, James P.; Butman, John (2007). Payback: Reaping the Rewards of Innovation. Cambridge, MA: Harvard Business School Press:   
 Sirkin, Harold L.; Rose, Justin R.; Zinser, Michael (2012). The US Manufacturing Renaissance: How Shifting Global Economics Are Creating an American Comeback. Philadelphia, PA: Knowledge at Wharton:

See also
Boston Consulting Group
Globality

References

External links
Globality (Boston Consulting Group website dedicated to the book by Sirkin et al.)
 BusinessWeek. "Why Multinationals Need Chinese MBAs". January 9, 2006.
 BusinessWeek. "Being Global". July 14, 2008.
 Knowledge@Wharton. "Whether You Agree with Globality of Disagree, Don't Ignore It". August 20, 2008.
 BusinessWeek. "Global Talent Growth". September 15, 2008.
 Knowledge@Wharton. "BCG's Hal Sirkin on 'Globality' and the New Two-way Street of Global Business". September 22, 2008
 The Washington Post. "Competing With Everybody From Everywhere For Everything". November 3, 2008.
 Knowledge@Wharton. "'Globality': Why Companies Are Competing with Everyone from Everywhere for Everything". November 20, 2008.
 The Economist. "Books of the Year". December 4, 2008.
 Hal Sirkin’s commentaries on bcg.perspectives

1959 births
American business writers
American consultants
Boston Consulting Group people
Businesspeople from New York City
Living people
University of Chicago Booth School of Business alumni
Wharton School of the University of Pennsylvania alumni
Writers from New York City